John Bishop: In Conversation With... is a British talk show hosted by comedian and actor John Bishop. It first aired on British television channel W on the 1st September 2016.

The second series of 10 episodes aired from 16 March 2017 and the third series began on 14 September 2017. A fourth series was commissioned in November 2017 and began on 5 July 2018.

Format
The series features Bishop meeting with a celebrity guest and having an intimate conversation with them in front of a live studio audience.

Production
The show is filmed at The Hospital Club in London.

The series was commissioned on 1 March 2016. A further three series of the show have been made.

Series overview

Episodes

Series 1 (2016)

Series 2 (2017)

Series 3 (2017)

Series 4 (2018)

References

External links
 Official website

2016 British television series debuts
2018 British television series endings
2010s British television talk shows
British television talk shows
UKTV original programming
English-language television shows